List of cultural assets of Algeria includes monuments, natural sites and parks, and other cultural assets as classed by the Algerian Ministry of Culture. The Ministry's list was updated in September 2019 with 1,030 cultural assets across the country. Skikda Province has the highest number of assets at 131.

Adrar Province 

There are 7 cultural assets in Adrar: 4 historical sites, 2 contemporary sites of cultural importance, and 1 nature reserve.

Chlef Province

Laghouat Province

Oum El Bouaghi Province

Batna Province

Béjaïa Province

Biskra Province

Béchar Province

Blida Province

Bouira Province

Tamanghasset Province

Tébessa Province

Tlemcen Province

Tiaret Province

Tizi Ouzou Province

Algiers Province

Djelfa Province

Jijel Province

Sétif Province

Saïda Province

Skikda Province

Sidi Bel Abbes Province

Annaba Province

Guelma Province

Constantine Province

Médéa Province

Mostaganem Province

M'Sila Province

Mascara Province

Ouargla Province

Oran Province

El Bayadh Province

Illizi Province

Bordj Bou Arréridj Province

Boumerdès Province

El Taref Province

Tindouf Province

Tissemsilt Province

El Oued Province

Khenchela Province

Souk Ahras Province

Tipaza Province

Mila Province

Aïn Defla Province

Naâma Province

Aïn Témouchent

Ghardaïa Province

Relizane Province

See also 
 List of heritage registers

References